Caroline Krook (born 18 November 1944 in Stockholm) is a retired Swedish bishop in the Church of Sweden. In 1990 she was appointed as Dean of Storkyrkan.

Biography
Krook was ordained priest in 1969 for the Diocese of Lund and was appointed a prison chaplain in Malmö, the first female to do so in Sweden. She was the bishop of the Diocese of Stockholm from 1998 until her retirement in 2009, when she was succeeded by Eva Brunne. Krook lives in Stockholm.

References

1944 births
Living people
21st-century Lutheran bishops
Lutheran bishops of Stockholm
Women Lutheran bishops